Sadang may refer to:

 Sadang-dong
 Sadang station
 Sadang River